The Zook's Mill Covered Bridge is a covered bridge that spans Cocalico Creek in Lancaster County, Pennsylvania, United States. A county-owned and maintained bridge, its official designation is the Cocalico #7 Bridge.  The bridge is also known as Wenger Covered Bridge or Rose Hill Covered Bridge. It is located west of Brownstown on T 797, near the Warwick and West Earl Townships.

The bridge has a single span, wooden, double Burr arch trusses design with the addition of steel hanger rods. The deck is made from oak planks.  It is painted red, the traditional color of Lancaster County covered bridges, on both the inside and outside. Both approaches to the bridge are painted red with white trim.

The bridge is 74 feet long and 13 feet three inches wide. It has a wooden burr type truss and was built in 1849 by Henry Zook. Unlike many other bridges in the county the bridge withstood Hurricane Agnes, despite being filled with  feet of water. It is also known as the Wenger Covered Bridge, the Rose Hill Covered Bridge, and the Cocalico #7 Bridge.

The bridge's WGCB Number is 38-36-14. Added in 1980, it is listed on the National Register of Historic Places as structure number 80003508.  It is located at  (40.13017, -76.23183).

The bridge was featured in the 1978 film The Boys from Brazil.

Dimensions 
Length: 74 feet (22.6 m) span and  total length
Width:  clear deck and  total width
Overhead clearance: 
Underclearance:

Gallery

See also
Burr arch truss
List of Lancaster County covered bridges

References 

Covered bridges in Lancaster County, Pennsylvania
Bridges completed in 1849
Covered bridges on the National Register of Historic Places in Pennsylvania
1849 establishments in Pennsylvania
National Register of Historic Places in Lancaster County, Pennsylvania
Road bridges on the National Register of Historic Places in Pennsylvania
Wooden bridges in Pennsylvania
Burr Truss bridges in the United States